A Kuwaiti chest is a large wooden chest, usually having been made in India, and covered in various brass studs and designs.  It was primarily used by a captain of Arabian dhows for their personal possessions.

References

 
 

Chests (furniture)